Ngh’wele, or Kwere, is a Bantu language of the Morogoro and Dodoma regions of Tanzania.

References

Languages of Tanzania
Northeast Coast Bantu languages